Flipped is a 2010 American romantic comedy-drama film co-written and directed by Rob Reiner, and based on Wendelin Van Draanen's 2001 novel of the same name. Starring Callan McAuliffe, Madeline Carroll, Rebecca De Mornay, Anthony Edwards, John Mahoney, Penelope Ann Miller, Aidan Quinn, and Kevin Weisman, the film tells the story of two eighth graders who start to have feelings for each other, despite being total opposites. Flipped was released in theaters in the United States on August 6, 2010 by Warner Bros. Pictures. It garnered lukewarm reviews from critics, and grossed $4.3 million against a $14 million budget. It has since garnered greater appreciation for its realistic portrayal of teenagers and a wider viewership via home-video and streaming services, so much so that it is now considered a cult favorite.

Plot
In 1957, 7-year-old Bryce Loski moves in across the street from Julianna "Juli" Baker. Looking into each other's eyes, Juli knows it’s love, but Bryce is put off and avoids her.

Four years later Juli is still completely enamored, rarely leaving Bryce alone. He tries everything to get rid of her, including dating Sherry Stalls, one of the most popular girls in school, whom he knows she dislikes. This does not deter her. Bryce's best friend Garrett, who has a crush on Sherry, tells her why Bryce is dating her, so she dumps him. Embarrassed, Bryce looks forward to seventh grade as he hopes with more students Juli will finally meet someone else.

The following year, Chet Duncan, Bryce's grandfather, moves in with the family. Juli adores an old sycamore tree in their neighborhood, but one day discovers the tree is going to be cut down. Juli tries to prevent its removal by climbing it and refusing to come down. After much attention from the town, her father Richard convinces her to come out of the tree and it is cut down. Juli is almost inconsolable until Richard gives her a painting of the tree, which helps her overcome her distress, and her exploits are written about in the local paper.

Juli raises chickens in her backyard as part of a school project and soon finds them laying eggs, which she sells to their neighbors but gives to Bryce as a gesture. She is hurt when she finds out Bryce has been throwing away the eggs she offered, out of his father's fear of salmonella due to the state of their yard. Embarrassed, Juli decides to fix it up.

After reading about Juli in the paper, Chet helps her with her yard work and develops real affection for her, as she reminds him of his late wife. When traditional and house proud Steven, Bryce's father, criticizes the Bakers' apparent lack of care for their property, Chet confides that it's rented, as they devote most of their finances to caring for Juli's mentally-disabled uncle David. The property is supposed to be cared for by their landlord. As Chet spends more time with Juli and encourages Bryce to be more open-minded, Bryce realizes he has feelings for her.

Meanwhile, as Juli is encouraged to broaden her mind by Chet, she starts to question if she actually likes Bryce. Going with her father to visit Daniel on his birthday, they have a difficult but ultimately positive interaction. Afterward, Juli is told by a classmate that Bryce has been admiring her, but she overhears Bryce agreeing with Garrett as he makes fun of her and Daniel, causing Juli to completely lose interest in him. Unbeknownst to her, Bryce is disgusted with Garrett's attitude and stops spending time with him, but they remain friendly.

Feeling bad about their indifference towards the Bakers, Bryce's mother Patsy invites them over for a family dinner. Bryce is excited, but Juli tells him privately that she overheard Bryce making fun of her and her uncle, calling him a coward for not defending her. The dinner gets off to an awkward start, but is a success. After dinner, Juli apologizes to Bryce for her behavior, and he realizes she feels complete indifference to him, leaving him feeling confused and hurt.

As the basket boy auction, an annual school charity event, approaches, Bryce finds out he has been selected as a basket boy and will be auctioned off to the other students along with a homemade lunch. Juli finds out Sherry is planning to bid on Bryce, but acts uninterested. Bryce hears a rumor that Sherry and another girl are going to bid for him and Juli is seen having a lot of cash with her, but out of sympathy she bids on a rejected boy named Eddie Trulock instead. Sherry bids on Bryce and wins.

During the basket boy lunch, Bryce is completely uninterested in Sherry's conversation, and instead watches Juli eat with Eddie Trulock. Overwhelmed with jealousy, Bryce gets up and tries to kiss Juli in front of all their classmates, but she rejects him and runs off in humiliation. Bryce runs after her, and Garrett confronts him for abandoning the prettiest girl in school. When he makes fun of Juli, Bryce ends their friendship for good. He tries to talk to Juli and explain, but Juli won't see or speak to him.

Two days later, with Richard's permission, Bryce plants a sapling sycamore tree in Juli's front yard to show her how he truly feels. When she sees this, she goes out to help him and realizes that after all these years, they have never really talked. As they plant the tree, their hands touch, they look into each other’s eyes and share a knowing smile.

Cast

Madeline Carroll as Julianna "Juli" Baker
Morgan Lily as young Juli
Callan McAuliffe as Bryce Loski
Ryan Ketzner as young Bryce
Rebecca De Mornay as Patsy Loski
Anthony Edwards as Steven Loski
John Mahoney as Chet Duncan. This was Mahoney’s final film before his death in 2018.
Penelope Ann Miller as Trina Baker
Aidan Quinn as Richard Baker
Kevin Weisman as Daniel Baker
Cody Horn as Lynetta Loski
Gillian Pfaff as young Lynetta
Shane Harper as Matt Baker
Michael Christopher Bolten as Mark Baker
Stefanie Scott as Dana Tressler
Israel Broussard as Garrett Einbinder
Ashley Taylor as Sherry Stalls
Matthew Gold as Eddie Trulock
Jake Reiner as Skylers

Reception
Flipped has received lukewarm reviews. On review aggregator Rotten Tomatoes, the film has garnered a 54% approval rating based on 76 reviews, with an average rating of 6.00/10. The consensus reads: "While not without its nostalgic charms, Rob Reiner's sometimes awkward adaptation of Wendelin Van Draanen's childhood novel doesn't reach the heights of the director's earlier work like Stand By Me." On Metacritic, the film holds a rating of 45 out of 100, indicating "mixed or average reviews"..

Home media
Flipped was released on DVD and Blu-ray on November 23, 2010.

Soundtrack
"Pretty Little Angel Eyes” – Curtis Lee
"One Fine Day" – The Chiffons
"He's So Fine" – The Chiffons
"Chantilly Lace" – Big Bopper
"There Goes My Baby" – The Drifters
"You've Really Got a Hold on Me" – The Miracles
"Devoted to You" – The Everly Brothers
"A Teenager in Love" – Dion and the Belmonts
"When" – The Kalin Twins
"Let It Be Me" – Phil Everly
"What's Your Name" – Rob Reiner, Michael Christopher Bolten, and Shane Harper [Org: Don & Juan]
"Flipped Suite" – Marc Shaiman

References

External links

2010 films
2010 romantic comedy films
American coming-of-age comedy films
American romantic comedy films
Castle Rock Entertainment films
2010s English-language films
Films based on American novels
Films based on romance novels
Films directed by Rob Reiner
Films scored by Marc Shaiman
Films set in 1957
Films set in 1963
Films shot in Michigan
Films with screenplays by Rob Reiner
Warner Bros. films
2010s American films